Gadiya Gaon is a village in Jhansi district in Uttar Pradesh, India.

Villages in Jhansi district